Linga is a small, uninhabited island,  east of Muckle Roe in the Shetland Islands.

Geography and geology
Linga is almost completely round, with a central peak. It lies between the mouths of Olna Firth and Gon Firth on the west coast of the Shetland Mainland. To the north is Delting on the Mainland, and the Mainland is also to the south and east. Papa Little is to the south west, and Mavis Grind to the north.

There is a submerged rock known as Groin Baa to the north.

The island is composed of gneiss and schist, with some quartzite and pelite. Its landscape is one of rough grass and heather.

Footnotes

Uninhabited islands of Shetland